Richard J. Gage (1842 – April 28, 1903) was a soldier in the 104th Illinois Infantry during the American Civil War. On July 2, 1863, he volunteered for an attack on a blockhouse by the Elk River in Tennessee. On October 30, 1897, he received the Medal of Honor, the highest decoration in the U.S. military, for his participation in this action.

Gage joined the 104th Illinois Infantry in August 1862. He was captured at the Battle of Chickamauga, and was incarcerated at Libby Prison for the next 6 months. Gage was discharged in February 1865.

Medal of Honor citation
Gage's Medal of Honor citation reads:
Voluntarily joined a small party that, under a heavy fire, captured a stockade and saved the bridge.

See also

 List of Medal of Honor recipients

References

United States Army Medal of Honor recipients
1842 births
1903 deaths
Union Army soldiers
People from Grafton County, New Hampshire
American Civil War recipients of the Medal of Honor